Several ships of the Chilean Navy have been named Almirante Condell after Admiral Carlos Condell (1846–1912), hero of the Battle of Punta Gruesa during the War of the Pacific:

 , (1891–1919), later renamed Talcahuano, an 
 , a Type 23 frigate, the former HMS Marlborough (F233), commissioned into the Chilean Navy in 2008

Almirante Condell, Chilean ship